The 1960 Lenoir Rhyne Bears football team was an American football team that compiled an undefeated 11–0–1 record and won the NAIA national football championship.

Season summary
The team represented Lenoir Rhyne College (now known as Lenoir–Rhyne University) as a member of the North State Conference (NSC) during the 1960 NAIA football season. In their 19th season under head coach Clarence Stasavich, the team compiled an 11–0–1 record (6–0 against NSC opponents) and won the NSC championship. The Bears were ranked No. 2 in the final Associated Press small college poll and No. 3 in the final UPI small college coaches poll. (The small college polls included both NCAA and NAIA programs.) Both polls were issued before the team's post-season victories.

On December 3, the Bears played  in the NAIA's Eastern Regional playoff. The game ended in a 20–20 tie.  NAIA officials decided to award Lenoir Rhyne the Eastern berth in the Holiday Bowl (then the NAIA national championship game) based on total yards gained by in the playoff game.

In the Holiday Bowl, Lenoir Rhyne defeated Humboldt State, 15–14, to win the NAIA national championship. The Bears trailed, 14-12, late in the game after freshman kicker Marion Kirby missed two extra point tries. With 1:35 remaining in the game, Kirby kicked a game-winning field goal. 

The team played its home games at Lenoir Rhyne College Field in Hickory, North Carolina.

Honors and awards

The team was led on offense by tailback Lee Farmer. He was selected as the NSC's most valuable player for the second consecutive season.  Farmer scored both of Lenoir Rhyne's touchdowns in the Holiday Bowl and was named the game's most valuable player.

Coach Stasavich finished second in the balloting (behind New Mexico State's Warren Woodson) for small college coach of the year.

Schedule

References

Lenoir Rhyne
Lenoir–Rhyne Bears football seasons
NAIA Football National Champions
College football undefeated seasons
Lenoir–Rhyne Bears football